Clifford Brown with Strings is a 1955 studio album by trumpeter Clifford Brown.

Track listing 
 "Yesterdays" (Otto Harbach, Jerome Kern) – 2:59
 "Laura" (Johnny Mercer, David Raksin) – 3:26
 "What's New?" (Johnny Burke, Bob Haggart) – 3:23
 "Blue Moon" (Lorenz Hart, Richard Rodgers) – 3:13
 "Can't Help Lovin' Dat Man" (Oscar Hammerstein II, Kern) – 3:43
 "Embraceable You" (George Gershwin, Ira Gershwin) – 3:00
 "Willow Weep for Me" (Ann Ronell) – 3:24
 "Memories of You" (Eubie Blake, Andy Razaf) – 3:31
 "Smoke Gets in Your Eyes" (Harbach, Kern) – 3:14
 "Portrait of Jenny" (Gordon Burdge, J. Russel Robinson) – 3:24
 "Where or When" (Hart, Rodgers) – 3:26
 "Stardust" (Hoagy Carmichael, Mitchell Parish) – 3:23

Personnel

Performance 
 Clifford Brown - trumpet
 Richie Powell - piano
 Max Roach - drums
 George Morrow - double bass
 Barry Galbraith - guitar

 Neal Hefti - arranger, conductor

References 

1955 albums
Albums arranged by Neal Hefti
Albums conducted by Neal Hefti
Clifford Brown albums
EmArcy Records albums
Orchestral jazz albums